The 1890 New York Athletic Club football team was an American club football team that represented the New York Athletic Club in the American Football Union (AFU) during the 1890 football season. The New York team played their home games at the Polo Grounds in Manhattan.

Schedule

References

New York Athletic Club
New York Athletic Club football seasons
New York Athletic Club football